Kevin Andrus is an American politician from Idaho. Andrus has served as a Republican member of Idaho House of Representatives for District 28 seat B since 2018.

Early life and education 
Andrus was born in Pocatello, Idaho. Andrus' father, Ken Andrus, is a rancher who served as a member of the Idaho House of Representatives. Andrus graduated from Marsh Valley High School. In 2012, Andrus earned a Bachelor of Science degree in Agricultural Business and Management from Brigham Young University–Idaho. In 2017, Andrus earned an MBA degree from Idaho State University College of Business.

Career 
Andrus was a Ranch Foreman, a horse trainer, and a business consultant. In 2017, Andrus became a loan officer at Ireland Bank in Malad City, Idaho. In 2018, Andrus became a manager at Andrus Ranch.

On November 6, 2018, Andrus won the election and became a Republican member of Idaho House of Representatives for District 28, seat B.

Andrus served on the following committees in the 2019–2020 Legislative session: Agricultural Affairs, Business, and State Affairs.

Personal life 
Andrus and his wife, Shelby Andrus, live in Lava Hot Springs, Idaho.

References

External links 
 Kevin Andrus at ballotpedia.org
 Kevin Andrus at andrusforidaho.com

Republican Party members of the Idaho House of Representatives
People from Bannock County, Idaho
Living people
Year of birth missing (living people)
21st-century American politicians